Korea Zinc Company, Ltd. is a non-ferrous metal smelter headquartered in Seoul, South Korea. It is one of the leading refined zinc-producing companies alongside Nyrstar, Hindustan Zinc, and Boliden.

Korea Zinc was founded by Choi Ki-ho and Chang Byung-hee in 1974. Since its establishment, Korea Zinc has been co-managed by the Choi and Chang families.

Operations
Korea Zinc has an annual production capacity of 650,000 tons of zinc and 420,000 tons of lead. In addition, while smelting the zinc and lead, Korea Zinc produces gold, silver, and sulfuric acid as byproducts. Korea Zinc's production base is the Onsan refinery located in Ulsan, South Korea. The company also manufactures and sells zinc ore through its Australian subsidiary, Sun Metals Corporation.

See also
 Sun Metals Solar Farm

References

External links
 

South Korean companies established in 1974
Companies listed on the Korea Exchange
Companies based in Seoul